DC's Young Animal is a "pop-up" imprint of DC Comics started in 2016. It was developed in collaboration with Gerard Way, an American musician and comic book writer, author of The Umbrella Academy. Its main focus is to relaunch characters and settings from the DC Universe in stories for mature readers, done with a more experimental approach than DC's primary line of superhero comics. The line has been overseen by Vertigo group editor Jamie S. Rich and executive editor Mark Doyle.

Gerard Way has said that a shared theme of the Young Animal comics is "relationships between parents and children". Other themes he has cited are alienation, fame, change ("self-actualization and becoming something else"), as well as bullying, teenagers and drug use (in Shade, the Changing Girl), and eventually "a lot of personal stuff for me in Doom Patrol that deals with mature themes".

History 
The imprint launched in late 2016 with four ongoing series: Doom Patrol, Shade the Changing Girl, Cave Carson Has a Cybernetic Eye, and Mother Panic; followed in 2017 by a 6-issue limited series Bug! The Adventures of Forager. In the middle of 2018 was a five-part crossover involving members of the Justice League, which was called Milk Wars. Three of the series were then relaunched as Shade the Changing Woman, Cave Carson Has an Interstellar Eye, and Mother Panic: Gotham A.D., running for 6 issues under those names, along with the new title Eternity Girl, which also ran for 6 issues. The line was placed on hold in August 2018, with the 12th issue of the delayed Doom Patrol series going on sale the following October.

One of the "Young Animal" titles, Doom Patrol resumed in July 2019, and was joined by two new titles, Far Sector and Collapser.

Titles 
 Shade, the Changing Girl – by Cecil Castellucci and Marley Zarcone – is based on the earlier Vertigo series Shade, the Changing Man. It is about an alien who is obsessed with a discontinued line of missions to Earth using a "Madness Cloak". She takes and uses it, and becomes stuck on Earth, waking up in the body of a girl, a high school bully who had been in a coma after nearly drowning in a lake.
 Mother Panic – by Jody Houser and Tommy Lee Edwards – is about Violet Paige, a temperate young celebrity whom no one suspects to be keeping gigantic secrets from everyone, who seeks revenge on her privileged peers. She operates in Gotham City and is often monitored by Batman and the Bat Family.
 Doom Patrol – by Gerard Way and Nick Derington – is another series from DC featuring "freak" heroes. The protagonist is Casey Brinke, an EMT who can only remember impossible things from her childhood. She is introduced into Dannyland, a seemingly impossible place that has the answers to her past and her future.
 Cave Carson Has a Cybernetic Eye – by Jon Rivera, Gerard Way, and Michael Avon Oeming – is a revival of DC's underground explorer Cave Carson. Twelve years after retirement, he joins his daughter Chloe in adventures, stealing his old digging machine and setting forth on a wacky adventure involving cults, mushrooms, and Superman.
 Bug: The Adventures of Forager – miniseries by Lee Allred, Michael Allred, and Laura Allred – is based on the 1970s Jack-Kirby-created character Forager.
 Eternity Girl – miniseries by writer Magdalene Visaggio and artist Sonny Liew  – began as a result of the Milk Wars crossover event. It involves a former super-spy named Caroline Sharp who possesses the power of eternal life. Themes of depression and existentialism were explored throughout the 6-issue series.
Collapser – by Mikey Way and Shaun Simon.
Far Sector – by N.K. Jemisin and Jamal Campbell – 12-issue sci-fi murder mystery featuring Green Lantern Sojourner "Jo" Mullein; nominated for the 2021 Eisner Award for Best Limited Series.

References

External links
 
 

Publishers of adult comics
DC Comics imprints
2016 in comics
Comics by Gerard Way